Abrahm Lustgarten is a senior environmental reporter for ProPublica who frequently works in partnership with the New York Times Magazine. He focuses on the intersections of business, climate and energy.

Biography
Lustgarten's 2017 expose "Bombs in Our Backyard" examined the U.S. Department of Defense's $300 billion environmental liabilities, and 40,000 acres of American lands polluted by military testing. It won the Society of Environmental Journalists Nina Mason Pulliam award for investigative environmental reporting, and is the subject of his forthcoming book, Hollowed Ground, to be published by Farrar, Straus and Giroux. Lustgarten's 2015 series examining the causes of water scarcity in the American West, “Killing the Colorado,” was a finalist for the 2016 Pulitzer Prize for national reporting and received the 2016 Keck Futures Initiative Communication Award from the National Academies of Sciences, Engineering, and Medicine.

Lustgarten also co-produced the 2016 Discovery Channel film “Killing the Colorado”, and has previously worked with PBS Frontline, including on the 2010 documentary “The Spill,” about how BP’s corporate culture of recklessness and profiteering led to the Deepwater Horizon tragedy. That film was nominated for an Emmy. His early investigation into the environmental and economic consequences of fracking led the earliest news reporting on the issue and is credited for drawing national attention to hydraulic fracturing, leading to a ban on the process in New York State, and informing the story behind the documentary film Gasland. Lustgarten's fracking investigative series received the George Polk award for environmental reporting, the National Press Foundation award for best energy writing, a Sigma Delta Chi award and was honored as finalist for Harvard's Goldsmith Prize.

Before joining ProPublica in 2008, Lustgarten was a staff writer for Fortune magazine, and an adjunct professor at the University of Oregon.
His work has appeared in The New York Times, The Washington Post, Mother Jones, Esquire, Salon, and Scientific American, among other publications.

He is the author of two books, China’s Great Train: Beijing’s Drive West and the Campaign to Remake Tibet, a project that was funded in part by a grant from the MacArthur Foundation, and Run to Failure: BP and the Making of the Deepwater Horizon Disaster.

He graduated from Cornell University with a BS in anthropology, and from Columbia University with an MA in journalism.

Personal life

See also
Economics of global warming
Politics of global warming

Awards
2016 Pulitzer Prize finalist, National Reporting
2017 Nina Mason Pulliam Award for Outstanding Environmental Reporting
2016 National Academies Keck Futures Award 
2009 George Polk Award
2009 Goldsmith Prize finalist
 MacArthur Foundation grant for international reporting

Works
China's Great Train; Beijing's Drive West and the Campaign to Remake Tibet. Macmillan, 2008, 
Run to Failure: BP and the Making of the Deepwater Horizon Disaster, W. W. Norton, 2012,

References

External links
Author's website

American male journalists
Cornell University alumni
Columbia University Graduate School of Journalism alumni
University of Oregon faculty
George Polk Award recipients
Living people
Year of birth missing (living people)